Marko Božič (born 7 February 1984) is a retired Slovenian footballer who played as a midfielder.

Club career
Božič played for Mura and Koper in Slovenia. He played both legs of UEFA Cup qualification for Koper that season, before went to FK Rad of Serbia on 5 September 2007.

International career
He was called up for a friendly match against Serbia and Montenegro on 18 August 2004, but did not play in the match. He was capped for Slovenia U21 in 2004 and 2006. At U19 level, he was in the squad of Slovenian U19 team entered the second qualifying round of the 2003 UEFA European Under-19 Football Championship.

References

External links
Profile and stats at PrvaLiga 

1984 births
Living people
Sportspeople from Koper
Slovenian footballers
Association football midfielders
FC Koper players
NK Mura players
Slovenian expatriate footballers
Slovenian expatriate sportspeople in Italy
Expatriate footballers in Italy
Slovenian PrvaLiga players
Treviso F.B.C. 1993 players
NK Domžale players
NK Ivančna Gorica players
Slovenian expatriate sportspeople in Serbia
Expatriate footballers in Serbia
FK Rad players
Slovenia youth international footballers
Slovenia under-21 international footballers